The 1861 Confederate States House of Representatives election in Florida was held on Wednesday, November 6, 1861 to elect the two Confederate States Representatives from the state of Florida, one from each of the state's congressional districts, to represent Florida in the 1st Confederate States Congress. The election coincided with the elections of other offices, including the presidential election and various state and local elections.

The winning candidate would serve a two-year term in the Confederate States House of Representatives from February 18, 1862, to February 17, 1864.

Background 
Florida seceded from the Union on January 10, 1861 and joined the Confederate States of America. The state appointed five delegates to the Provisional Confederate Congress, to serve in interim until the Congress first convened on February 18, 1862.

District 1

Candidates 
 Antonio A. Canova, state representative
 James M. Commander, former U.S. Army general
 James Baird Dawkins, former U.S. attorney for the U.S. Circuit Court for the Eastern District of Florida
 Philip Dell, former president of the Florida Senate

General election

Results

Aftermath 
Dawkins resigned from Congress on December 9, 1862 following his appointment to a state court by Governor John Milton. The special election to replace him was won by John Marshall Martin.

District 2

Candidates 

 Frederick R. Cotton, planter
 Robert Benjamin Hilton, former U.S. representative-elect
 James L. Mosely, former North Carolina state representative
 John Tanner, former Orange County commissioner
 Frederick L. Villepigue, secretary of state of Florida

General election

Results

See also 
 Confederate States House of Representatives elections, 1861

References

Notes 

1st Confederate States Congress
Fla
Con
Fla
Non-partisan elections
Fla
Political history of the Confederate States of America